Asociación Deportiva Santa Rosa Guachipilino are a Salvadoran professional football club based in Santa Rosa Guachipilin, El Salvador.
The club currently plays in the Second Division of El Salvador.

History

On 27 May 2018, Santa Rosa Guachipilino won the Tercera Division play-off Final against Turin FESA to gain promotion to the segunda division.

Honours

League
Tercera Division and predecessors
 Champions: (1) : Apertura 2017
 Champions:  2017–2018 (Play-offs Champions)

La Asociación Departamental de Fútbol Aficionado and predecessors (4th tier)
Champions (1): 2016

Sponsors
 Diadora
 Alcaldia Santa Rosa Guachipilin

List of Coaches
 Samuel Maldonaldo (- December 2018)
 Carlos Martínez (December 2018 – December 2019)
 Samuel Maldonaldo (December 2019 - May 2021)
 Alfredo Portillo Petro (June 2021-Present)

References

External links
 []

Football clubs in El Salvador